Massimo Calvelli (born 16 November 1974) is an Italian sports executive and former professional tennis player.

Born in Montevarchi, Calvelli was an Italian World Youth Cup representative in his junior career and made the boys' singles semi-finals of the 1991 Australian Open.Calvelli turned professional in 1992 and competed briefly on the international tour, reaching a best singles ranking of 255 in the world. Most notably he featured in the main draw of the Bologna ATP Tour tournament in 1995 and won his first round match over world number 56 Vincent Spadea.Since 2020 he has served as the chief executive officer of the Association of Tennis Professionals.

References

External links
 
 

1974 births
Living people
Italian male tennis players
Italian sports executives and administrators
Sportspeople from the Province of Arezzo
Medalists at the 1997 Summer Universiade
Universiade bronze medalists for Italy
Universiade medalists in tennis